The Red Samson is a 1917 Hungarian film directed by Michael Curtiz. The production is based upon the 1890 novel The Bondman by Hall Caine.

Cast
 Gyula Csortos as Samson Woronzow
 Ica von Lenkeffy as Edith Thursten
 Tivadar Uray as Michael Woronzow
 László Csiky as Edward Thursten
 János Bodnár as Ivan Woronzow
 Irma Lányi as Samson's mother

See also
The Bondman (1916)
The Bondman (1929)
 Michael Curtiz filmography

References

External links
 

Films directed by Michael Curtiz
1917 films
Hungarian black-and-white films
Hungarian silent feature films
Films based on British novels
Austro-Hungarian films